189th may refer to:

189th (Canadien-Français) Battalion, CEF, a unit in the Canadian Expeditionary Force during the First World War
189th Airlift Squadron, a unit of the Idaho Air National Guard that flies the C-130 Hercules
189th Airlift Wing, an airlift unit located at Little Rock AFB, Arkansas
189th Infantry Brigade (United States)

See also
189 (number)
189, the year 123 (CLXXXIX) of the Julian calendar